The NCR Voyager was an SMP computer platform produced by the NCR Corporation circa 1985.  Linux support for some models existed between 2005 and 2010.

Sources
 
 
 
 

 

NCR Corporation products